Eslamabad (also Romanized as Eslāmābād; also known as Gerdeh Mahīn) is a village in Aghmiyun Rural District, in the Central District of Sarab County, East Azerbaijan Province, Iran. At the 2006 census, its population was 1,256, in 315 families.

References 

Populated places in Sarab County